Kawaji (written: 川路) is a Japanese surname. Notable people with the surname include:

, Japanese politician
, pen name of Kawaki Makoto, Japanese poet and literary critic

See also
Kawaji Station, a railway station in Iida, Nagano Prefecture, Japan

Japanese-language surnames